is a former Japanese football player and manager. he currently manager J3 League club of Ehime FC

Playing career
Ishimaru was born in Katano on October 30, 1973. After graduating from Hannan University, he joined the newly promoted J1 League club, Avispa Fukuoka in 1996. He became a regular player and played often until 2000. In 2001, he moved to the J2 League club Kyoto Purple Sanga. He played as a regular player and the club won the championship and was promoted to J1 in 2002. In 2002, the club won the Emperor's Cup, it was the first major title in club history. In 2003, he became a captain, and the club finished in last place and was relegated to J2 in 2004. In 2005, he did not play in any matches and he moved to the Japan Football League club Ehime FC in October. The club won the championship in 2005 and was promoted to J2 in 2006. He played many matches as a substitute and retired at the end of the 2006 season.

Coaching career
After retirement, Ishimaru started a coaching career at Ehime FC in 2007. He served as a coach for the top team (2007–09) and manager for the youth team (2010–12). In 2013, he became a manager for the top team until 2014. In 2015, he moved to Kyoto Sanga FC and became a coach. In July 2015, manager Masahiro Wada resigned and Ishimaru became the new manager as Wada's successor. In 2016, the club finished in 5th place and missed promotion to J1. He was terminated at the end of the season.

Club statistics

Managerial statistics

References

External links
 
 

1973 births
Living people
Hannan University alumni
Association football people from Osaka Prefecture
Japanese footballers
J1 League players
J2 League players
Japan Football League players
Avispa Fukuoka players
Kyoto Sanga FC players
Ehime FC players
Japanese football managers
J2 League managers
J3 League managers
Ehime FC managers
Kyoto Sanga FC managers
Montedio Yamagata managers
Association football midfielders
People from Katano